Kallar Kahar  is a town and subdivision (Tehsil) of Chakwal District in Punjab, Pakistan. It is the capital of Kallar Kahar Tehsil.

Emperor Babar described Kallar Kahar in his memoirs, the Takht-e-Babri, as a "charming place with good air". 

Katas Raj Temples, a famous complex of Hindu temples, is close to the town.Kallar kahar lake, tomb of Hubahu and Takht-e-Babri are famous places for tourists.

Among beautiful Villages of Tehsil Kallar Kahar Sardhi village is at top of mountains with beautiful view of M2 Motorway. Sardhi is located 17 Km from Kallar Kahar, most prominent villages including Miani, BuchalKhurd,  Buchal Kalan Wasnal and Munara as well. Neela Wahn Water Fall is also located 25 Km from Kallar towards Munara.

References

External links
 Tourism Development Corporation of Pakistan
 Latest pictures of Kallar Kahar
 Pictures and information of Kallar Kahar for Tourists

Union councils of Chakwal District
Populated places in Chakwal District
Tourist attractions in Punjab, Pakistan
Villages in Kallar Kahar Tehsil